Kropstädt is a village and a former municipality in Wittenberg district in Saxony-Anhalt, Germany. Since 1 January 2010, it is part of the town Wittenberg.

Geography
Kropstädt lies about 12 km northeast of Lutherstadt Wittenberg in the Fläming and is part of the Fläming Nature Park, which was opened in 2005.

Economy and transportation
Federal Highway (Bundesstraße) B 2 from Wittenberg to Berlin runs right through the community.

Sights
Castle Kropstädt with garden, built around 1850 on the place of the former water castle Liesnitz, which was built in 1150.

Personalities
Hans-Eckardt Wenzel, born 31 July 1955 is a German singer-songwriter, musician and lyricist.

Former municipalities in Saxony-Anhalt
Wittenberg